Celtis tournefortii, commonly known as the oriental hackberry is a deciduous tree in the genus Celtis.

The species is endemic to Southeastern Europe: Ukraine, Croatia, Bulgaria, Greece (including Crete), Sicily, Montenegro, North Macedonia; Western Asia: Cyprus, northwestern Iran, northern Iraq, Turkey; and the Caucasus region: Azerbaijan.

It can grow up to 6 meters in height and grows in plains and dry forests.

Citations

References
 
 The Plant List

tournefortii
Flora of Azerbaijan
Flora of Bulgaria
Flora of Crete
Flora of Croatia
Flora of Cyprus
Flora of Greece
Flora of Iran
Flora of Iraq
Flora of Italy
Flora of North Macedonia
Flora of Montenegro
Flora of Sicily
Flora of Turkey
Flora of Ukraine